Benjamin Michael Stanley Fairclough (born 18 April 1989) is an English footballer, who plays as a striker for Northern Premier League club Lincoln United.

Playing career

Notts County 
Fairclough signed for Notts County after impressing during a pre-season trial, having previously been at local rivals Nottingham Forest. He made his debut for County at home to Doncaster Rovers, in the 1–0 win in the League Cup on 12 August 2008. In 2009, Fairclough went on a short-term loan to Ilkeston Town. On 10 May 2010, he was released by Notts County along with seven other players.

Hinckley United 
He then signed for Hinckley United on 7 August 2010.

Rocester 
On 5 March 2010, he joined Rocester in the Midland Football Alliance on loan from Hinckley United. He became a favourite with the Roman fans playing on the right wing and finished the season of by scoring 7 goals in 17 games.

Eastwood Town 
Ahead of the 2011–12 season, he linked up with Eastwood Town, but he was out of favour and football was hard to come by.

Boston United 
In September 2011 the pacy forward joined Boston United rather than a reported move back to Rocester.

Belper Town 
In August 2015 Fairclough joined Belper Town and he made his debut against Carlton Town on 20 August.

Lincoln United 
During October 2015 Fairclough joined Lincoln United.

Personal life 
He is the nephew of former Nottingham Forest and Leeds United defender Chris Fairclough and cousin of former Nottingham Forest youth player Jordan Fairclough.

References

External links 

1989 births
Living people
Footballers from Nottingham
English footballers
Association football forwards
Nottingham Forest F.C. players
Notts County F.C. players
Ilkeston Town F.C. (1945) players
Hinckley United F.C. players
Rocester F.C. players
Eastwood Town F.C. players
Boston United F.C. players
Belper Town F.C. players
Lincoln United F.C. players
English Football League players